The Belgium men's national basketball team has represented Belgium in international basketball since 1928. The supervising body for the national team is Basketball Belgium.

Belgium has qualified for the EuroBasket 18 times throughout their history, achieving their best result at the event in 1947, where they finished in fourth place. Moreover, Belgium has competed at the Olympic Games on three occasions, in 1936, 1948, and 1952. However, Belgium is still in pursuit of making their first appearance at the FIBA World Cup.

The team is nicknamed and also represents itself as Belgian Lions.

History

1920s–1950s
Belgium played in their first official match on 6 May 1928, a 17–31 loss against France in Brussels. Belgium became a member of FIBA in 1933. In 1935, Belgium participated in the first European Basketball Championship. In their first game of the tournament, Belgium was defeated by Spain 25–17. Following the loss, Belgium was unable to advance into the semi-finals, and completed the rest of the competition in the classification round.

At the 1936 Olympic Games, Belgium was quickly eliminated, after posting an (0–2) record during their tournament stint. Ten years later, Belgium reappeared on the international stage at EuroBasket 1946. Entering the competition, the national team lost their only two games of the preliminary round, which sent them into to the classification phase. There, Belgium earned a victory against Poland 22–39. The team would pick up one more victory, over Luxembourg, to finish the event in seventh place. A year later, Belgium was back on the continental level for EuroBasket 1947. After dropping their first game of the tournament to Egypt, the national team turned around to heavily defeat Albania 114–11. In their final match of the preliminary round, Belgium won again, this time against Italy to advance. Belgium opened up the second group phase of the competition with a win over France 26–27. However, the team would go (2–2) for the rest of the event, including the classification round, for a fourth place finish. At the 1948 Olympic Games, Belgium failed to advance past the preliminary phase, and was once again relegated to the classification round to complete the event.

In 1950, Belgium participated in a European qualifying tournament for the inaugural FIBA World Cup. Ultimately, the team missed out on the competition, after narrow losses to Spain and Yugoslavia. The following year, Belgium entered the EuroBasket 1951, where the team went undefeated in the preliminary round at (3–0). However, the team would endure a complete reversal of their results in the quarter-final round, losing all three of their matches; and being sent into the classification phase to finish out the tournament.

At the 1952 Olympic Games, Belgium made their third appearance in the competition, losing two out of their three matches, and failing to make it past the tournament's first round. Heading to EuroBasket 1953, the struggles for Belgium on the international stage continued, as the national team posted a (1–2) record in the preliminary round; and was sent into the classification phase to closeout the event.

After a disappointing tournament for Belgium, the team declined to enter the competition in 1955, and instead entered the event in 1957. However, Belgium would once again compile subpar preliminary phase results at (0–3), and relegated to the classification round. Belgium would lose their first two matches of the phase, before earning their first win of the competition against Austria 58–70. Following the victory, Belgium prevailed in three out of their next four games, including a 90–48 win over Albania in their final game of the tournament. That was where national team guard Eddy Terrace scored (63 points), which set a single game EuroBasket record to that point. Two years later, Belgium made their seventh appearance in the competition for EuroBasket 1959, where they garnered a (2–1) record in the preliminary stage to qualify for the semi-final round. Although after losing two of the three games in the round, Belgium's chances for a medal finish were gone.

1960s–1990s
Heading into the 1960s, Belgium's first competition of the decade came at the EuroBasket 1961. After finishing second in their preliminary round group, the team advanced into the second group phase. However, even after winning three out of their four games in the round, Belgium was eliminated from medal contention. Two years later, at the EuroBasket 1963, Belgium won their opening match of the competition against Turkey 71–52. Although they would only manage to split their next six games in the round (3–3), and sent into the classification bracket to finish the tournament. In the ensuing years for Belgium, frustration continued to mount, as they would only qualify for the Euros once (1967), over the next fourteen years.

At EuroBasket 1977, Belgium hosted the event for the first time, and won their opening game 107–98 against Finland. However, the national team would lose three of their next four games in the preliminary round, and once again have to finish the competition in the classification stage. Two years later, Belgium's disastrous performance at the EuroBasket in 1979, culminated with the team going winless (0–7); and completing the tournament in last place. Following the event, Belgium failed to qualify for every major international competition during the 1980s. Fourteen years after competing in their last EuroBasket, Belgium qualified for the tournament in 1993. In Belgium's first game of the event, the national team defeated Slovenia 71–82. Ultimately, the victory for Belgium turned out to be their only one of the tournament, as they lost their next five games before being eliminated.

2000s–2010s
After the turn of the century, the arrival of Belgium at the EuroBasket in 2011, marked the first time the national team qualified for the continental stage in 18 years. However, they would endure a disappointing tournament, losing all five of their preliminary round matches to be eliminated. Two years later, the team made it back to the competition for EuroBasket 2013. Following a 57–58 loss to Ukraine in their first game of the tournament, Belgium displayed resilience in their second game, in a 73–77 overtime victory against Germany. Belgium went on to finish the preliminary phase with a (2–3) record, to advance into the second round. There, the team lost two of their three games before exiting the event. Belgium qualified for EuroBasket 2015, after finishing (5–1) during qualifying. Entering the finals, Belgium split their first two games of the competition, before earning a buzzer-beating win over Lithuania 74–76. Belgium would finish the group stage with a (3–2) record to advance. Although in the Round of 16, Belgium would be eliminated by Greece 75–54.

To reach EuroBasket 2017, Belgium once again went (5–1) during their qualifying campaign to make the finals. However, Belgium failed to sustain the momentum achieved during their qualification period, and were eliminated after a (1–4) record in the group stage. The struggles for Belgium would continue during European Qualifiers for the 2019 FIBA World Cup, as the team was ousted from the qualifiers following a (1–5) record.

2020s–present
Belgium entered Pre-Qualifiers for the EuroBasket 2022, where the national team went undefeated at (4–0), to move closer to clinching qualification. In the Qualifiers, Belgium completely dominated Lithuania at home in their first game 86–65. Following the victory, Belgium would go on to finish top of their qualifying group, to reach their fifth consecutive Euro finals. Drawn into Group A at the tournament, Belgium split their first two games of the event, prior to their impressive 83–73 win against the eventual champions Spain. Although after making it through the group stage, Belgium was eliminated in the Round of 16 to Slovenia 88–73.

Competitive record

FIBA World Cup

Olympic Games

EuroBasket

Results and fixtures

2021

2022

2023

Team

Current roster
Roster for the 2023 FIBA World Cup Qualifiers matches on 24 and 27 February 2023 against Great Britain and Turkey.

Depth chart

Head coach position

Past rosters
1935 EuroBasket: finished 6th among 10 teams

3 René Demanck, 4 Émile Laermans, 5 Louis Levaux, 6 Pierre Van Basselaere, 7 Gustave Vereecken, 8 Gaston de Houwer, 9 Robert Breuwer (Coach: ?)

1936 Olympic Games: finished 19th among 21 teams

1 Robert Breuwer, 2 Gustave Crabbe, 3 René Demanck, 4 Raymond Gérard, 5 Émile Laermans, 6 Guillaume Merckx, 7 Pierre Van Basselaere, 8 Gustave Vereecken (Coach: ?)

1946 EuroBasket: finished 7th among 10 teams

3 Armand Van Wambeke, 4 Henri Servaes, 5 Julien Meuris, 6 Georges Baert, 7 Henri Hermans, 8 Émile Kets, 9 Augustin Bernaer, 10 Alexander Hollanders, 11 Louis Van De Goor, 12 Henri Hollanders, 13 Marcel de Haeck, 14 Pierre Van Basselaere, 23 Fernand Rossius, 25 Auguste Wijns (Coach: Raymond Briot)

1947 EuroBasket: finished 4th among 14 teams

3 Armand Van Wambeke, 4 René Steurbaut, 5 Julien Meuris, 6 Georges Baert, 7 Henri Hermans, 8 Émile Kets, 9 Henri Coosemans, 10 Gustave Poppe, 11 Alexander Hollanders, 12 Henri Hollanders, 13 Fernand Rossius, 14 François De Pauw, 17 Joseph Pirard, 21 Guillaume van Damme (Coach: Raymond Briot)

1948 Olympic Games: finished 11th among 23 teams

3 Armand Van Wambeke, 4 René Steurbaut, 5 Julien Meuris, 6 Georges Baert, 7 Henri Hermans, 8 Émile Kets, 9 Henri Coosemans, 10 Alexander Hollanders, 11 Henri Hollanders, 12 Augustin Bernaer, 13 Louis Van De Goor, 14 François De Pauw, 15 Gustave Poppe, 16 Léon Lampo (Coach: Raymond Briot)

1951 EuroBasket: finished 7th among 17 teams

3 Jef Eygel, 4 Henri Crick, 5 Francois Plas, 6 Georges Baert, 7 François De Pauw, 8 Émile Kets, 9 Henri Coosemans, 10 Désiré Ligon, 11 Alexis Van Gils, 12 Philippe Dewandelaer, 13 Guy Gekiere, 14 Roger van Harck (Coach: Raymond Briot)

1952 Olympic Games: finished 18th among 23 teams

3 Jef Eygel, 4 Yvan Delsarte, 5 Julien Meuris, 6 Félix Roosemont, 8 Johannes Ducheyne, 9 Henri Coosemans, 10 Désiré Ligon, 11 Alexis Van Gils, 12 Henri Crick, 13 Jules Boes, 14 Jan Ceulemans, 16 Josef du Jardin (Coach: Raymond Briot)

1953 EuroBasket: finished 10th among 17 teams

3 Maurice Chavagne, 4 René Steurbaut, 5 Julien Meuris, 6 Georges Baert, 7 André Vermeulen, 8 Émile Kets, 9 Henri Coosemans, 10 Désiré Ligon, 11 Alexis Van Gils, 12 Edouard Samson, 13 Jean Nolis, 14 Roger van Harck, 15 Joseph Decombe, 16 Félix Roosemont (Coach: Louis van Hof)

1957 EuroBasket: finished 12th among 16 teams

3 Albert van Mechelen, 4 Robert Jolijt, 5 Charles Storme, 6 Georges de Meyer, 7 Jean de Nayer, 8 Elie Deweerdt, 9 Emile Martin, 10 Eddy Terrace, 11 John Loridon, 12 Alex van den Avondt, 13 Charles Feyen, 14 Lucien van Kersschaever (Coach: Eddy Verswijvel)

1959 EuroBasket: finished 7th among 17 teams

3 Rene Aerts, 4 Richard Wagner, 5 Pierre van Huele, 6 Jef Eygel, 7 Francois de Pauw, 8 Elie Deweerdt, 9 Jean Steveniers, 10 Lucien van Kersschaever, 11 John Loridon, 12 Henry Raets, 13 Lievin Vinck, 14 Maurice Chavagne (Coach: Eddy Verswijvel)

1961 EuroBasket: finished 8th among 19 teams

4 Andre Desplats, 5 Pierre van Huele, 6 Jef Eygel, 7 Rene Aerts, 8 Jean Steveniers, 9 Henri Degraeve, 10 Guido Scholiers, 11 John Loridon, 12 Joseph Serron, 13 Alphonse Maes, 15 Oscar Wauters, 16 Charles Feyen (Coach: René Mol)

1963 EuroBasket: finished 8th among 16 teams

4 Francois Clement, 5 Pierre van Huele, 6 Jef Eygel, 7 Rene Aerts, 8 Francois d’Hoir, 9 Lucien Michelet, 10 Guido Scholiers, 11 John Loridon, 12 Pierre Dewandeler, 13 Lucien van Kersschaever, 14 Willy Ivens, 15 Camille Dierckx (Coach: Roger Staes)

1967 EuroBasket: finished 15th among 16 teams

4 Camille Dierckx, 5 Willy Ivens, 6 Jef Eygel, 7 Rene Aerts, 8 Lucien Michelet, 9 Robert van Herzele, 10 Raoul Schoeters, 11 John Loridon, 12 Willy d’Hondt, 13 Lucien van Kersschaever, 14 Etienne Geerts, 15 Alfons Declerck (Coach: René Mol)

1977 EuroBasket: finished 8th among 12 teams

4 Alain Stollenberg, 5 Ive van Poppelen, 6 Robert van Herzele, 7 Olin "Corky" Bell, 8 Etienne Geerts, 9 Rene van den Broeck, 10 Imre Nytrai, 11 Jos Peeters, 12 Francois Huysmans, 13 Christian Becknel, 14 Roger Marien, 15 Hector Vermeersch (Coach: René Mol)

1979 EuroBasket: finished 12th among 12 teams

4 Alain Stollenberg, 5 Herman Reynders, 6 Eric Rogiers, 7 Jos Peeters, 8 Ive van Poppelen, 9 Tony Van den Bosch, 10 Imre Nytrai, 11 Rene van den Broeck, 12 Francois Huysmans, 13 Christian Becknel, 14 Etienne Geerts, 15 Rik Samaey (Coach: René Mol)

1993 EuroBasket: finished 12th among 16 teams

4 Jacques Stas, 5 Éric Struelens, 6 Dirk Snyders, 7 Ronny Bayer, 8 Rik Samaey, 9 Danny Herman, 10 Erik Cleymans, 11 Marc Deheneffe, 12 Herman Bruyninckx, 13 Ivan Verberckt, 14 Daniël Goethals, 15 Dimitri Lambrecht (Coach: Tony Van den Bosch)

2011 EuroBasket: finished 21st among 24 teams

4 Roel Moors, 5 Sam Van Rossom, 6 Christophe Beghin, 7 Randy Oveneke, 8 Jorn Steinbach, 9 Jonathan Tabu, 10 Dimitri Lauwers, 11 Guy Muya, 12 Marcus Faison, 13 Maxime De Zeeuw, 14 Tomas Van Den Spiegel, 15 D. J. Mbenga (Coach: Eddy Casteels)

2013 EuroBasket: finished 9th among 24 teams

4 Roel Moors, 5 Sam Van Rossom, 6 Christophe Beghin, 7 Axel Hervelle, 8 Jean-Marc Mwema, 9 Jonathan Tabu, 10 Quentin Serron, 11 Guy Muya, 12 Wen Mukubu, 13 Maxime De Zeeuw, 14 Sacha Massot, 15 Yannick Driesen (Coach: Eddy Casteels)

2015 EuroBasket: finished 13th among 24 teams

4 Lionel Bosco, 5 Sam Van Rossom, 7 Axel Hervelle (C), 8 Jean-Marc Mwema, 9 Jonathan Tabu, 10 Quentin Serron, 12 Wen Mukubu, 13 Pierre-Antoine Gillet, 14 Maxime De Zeeuw, 22 Kevin Tumba, 23 Jean Salumu, 24 Matt Lojeski (Coach: Eddy Casteels)

2017 EuroBasket: finished 19th among 24 teams

4 Manu Lecomte, 5 Sam Van Rossom, 7 Axel Hervelle (C), 8 Jean-Marc Mwema, 9 Jonathan Tabu, 10 Quentin Serron, 12 Jean Salumu, 13 Pierre-Antoine Gillet, 14 Maxime De Zeeuw, 16 Kevin Tumba, 19 Ismaël Bako, 22 Vincent Kesteloot (Coach: Eddy Casteels)

2022 EuroBasket: finished 14th among 24 teams

4 Manu Lecomte, 8 Jean-Marc Mwema, 9 Jonathan Tabu, 13 Pierre-Antoine Gillet, 14 Maxime De Zeeuw (C), 16 Kevin Tumba, 17 Hans Vanwijn, 18 Alexandre Libert, 19 Ismaël Bako, 21 Vrenz Bleijenbergh, 25 Haris Bratanovic, 32 Retin Obasohan (Coach: Dario Gjergja)

Kit

Manufacturer
2015: KIPSTA

Sponsor
2015: Voo

See also

Sport in Belgium
Belgium women's national basketball team
Belgium men's national under-20 basketball team
Belgium men's national under-18 basketball team
Belgium men's national under-16 basketball team
Belgium men's national 3x3 team

Footnotes

References

External links

Belgium FIBA profile
Belgian National Team – Men at Eurobasket.com
Belgium Basketball Records at FIBA Archive

Videos
Lithuania v Belgium - Group D - Game Highlights - EuroBasket 2015 Youtube.com video

 
Men's national basketball teams
1933 establishments in Belgium